Hidden Fires is a 1925 German silent film directed by Einar Bruun and starring Alfons Fryland, Mary Nolan, and Lisa Deihle. It was made at the Emelka Studios in Munich.

Cast

References

Bibliography

External links

1925 films
German black-and-white films
Films of the Weimar Republic
Films directed by Einar Bruun
German silent feature films
Films shot at Bavaria Studios
Bavaria Film films
1920s German films